Johann Georg Pisendel ( – 25 November 1755) was a German Baroque violinist and composer who, for many years, led the Court Orchestra in Dresden as concertmaster, then the finest instrumental ensemble in Europe. He was the leading violinist of his time, and composers such as Tomaso Albinoni, Georg Philipp Telemann and Antonio Vivaldi all dedicated violin compositions to him.

Life 
Pisendel was born in Cadolzburg, a small town near Nuremberg, where his father Simon Pisendel was the cantor and organist. At the age of nine, Johann Georg became a choirboy at the court chapel of Ansbach, where the singer Francesco Antonio Pistocchi was music director, and violinist and composer Giuseppe Torelli was concert master. It is thought that Pisendel studied the violin with Torelli. After his voice broke, Pisendel went on to play the violin in the Court Orchestra. In 1709, he left Dresden for Leipzig to further his musical studies.

On the way to Leipzig, he met Johann Sebastian Bach at Weimar. Pisendel was a member of the Collegium Musicum founded by Georg Philipp Telemann, and conducted it in 1710/11, while Melchior Hoffmann went on a concert tour. In 1711, after he performed at Darmstadt in an opera by Christoph Graupner, Pisendel was offered a position in the court orchestra there, but declined.

In 1711, he was offered a position as leading violinist at the Dresden Court Orchestra, which he accepted and began in January 1712. He studied composition there with Johann David Heinichen. He remained with the Dresden orchestra for the rest of his life. He was sent to represent the culture of Dresden in Europe by Elector Frederick Augustus II, to Paris in 1714, to Berlin in 1715, and to Venice in 1716, where he stayed for nine months and studied with Antonio Vivaldi.

In 1730, Pisendel became officially concert master of the Dresden Court Orchestra, a position he had filled already since Jean-Baptiste Volumier had died in 1728. Pisendel's pupils included Franz Benda and Johann Gottlieb Graun.

Pisendel died in Dresden.

Work 

Pisendel's surviving compositions are few in number but high in quality. All of his surviving works are instrumental. They include ten violin concertos, four concertos for orchestra, and two violin sonatas. His sonata for violin solo in A minor possibly influenced Bach's works in the genre.

Bach possibly wrote his violin sonatas for Pisendel. Tomaso Albinoni, Vivaldi and Telemann all dedicated works to him. A collection of extant instrumental works from the first half of the eighteenth century, which were kept in the so-called Schrank II (Cabinet II) of the Hofkirche, includes these dedications, numerous manuscripts with performance instructions in Pisendel's own hand, and scores he had copied himself. The Saxon State and University Library Dresden and the German Research Foundation completed digitizing the Schrank II collection in the summer of 2011, leading researchers to further study Pisendel's musical legacy.

Recordings 
 Pisendel. Neue Sonaten. Newly discovered sonatas for violin and continuo by Pisendel. Scaramuccia (Snakewood Editions, 2020)
 Violin concertos from Dresden. Pisendel, Heinichen, Fasch, Handel, Telemann. Johannes Pramsohler. International Baroque Players. (Raumklang RK 3105)
 J. G. Pisendel: Dresden Concertos. Concerti con varii strumenti (Concertos for various instruments). Performed by the Freiburg Baroque Orchestra with Gottfried von der Goltz and Petra Müllejans, solo violinists, conducted by Gottfried von der Goltz. (Carus 83301)
 Per Monsieur Pisendel. Violin sonatas by Vivaldi, Albinoni, & Pisendel. Performed by La Serenissima conducted by Adrian Chandler (Avie 0018) Six violin sonatas dedicated to or composed by Pisendel himself.
 1717. Memories of a Journey to Italy. Pisendel, Vivaldi, Montanari, Fanfani, Valentini and Albinoni. Ensemble Scaramuccia. (Snakewood Editions, 2018). Music collected or composed by Pisendel during his journey to Italy 1716–1717
 Concerto in G minor for violin and orchestra, Il pomo d'oro, Dmitry Sinkovsky, violin and conductor. CD Naîve 2019

References

Cited sources

Further reading 
 Hans Rudolf Jung: Johann Georg Pisendel: Leben und Werk. Ein Beitrag zur Geschichte der Violinmusik der Bach-Zeit. Univ. Diss, Jena 1956.
 Kai Köpp: Johann Georg Pisendel (1687–1755) und die Anfänge der neuzeitlichen Orchesterleitung. Schneider, Tutzing 2005, .
 Albrecht Treuheit: Johann Georg Pisendel: (1687–1755); Geiger – Konzertmeister – Komponist; Dokumentation seines Lebens, seines Wirkens u. Umgangs u. seines Werkes; nachgezeichnet aus Biogr., Kommentaren u. Veröff. d. letzten 250 Jahre. Edelmann, Nürnberg 1987.

External links

 
 Johann Georg Pisendel Gesellschaft (in German)
 The "Schrank II" or the legacy of Concert Master Johann Georg Pisendel snakewoodeditions.com 5 January 2019
 Johann Georg Pisendel / (1687–1755) Naxos Records
 Pisendel, Johann Georg bmlo.de
 Johann Georg Pisendel Associated Chamber Music Players

1687 births
1755 deaths
People from Fürth (district)
German classical violinists
Male classical violinists
German violinists
German male violinists
German Baroque composers
18th-century classical composers
German male classical composers
18th-century German composers
18th-century German male musicians